

1987

See also 
 1987 in Australia
 1987 in Australian television

References

External links 
 Australian film at the Internet Movie Database

1987
Lists of 1987 films by country or language
Films